Agostina Segatori (Ancona 1841–1910 Paris) was a famous model who posed for celebrated painters in Paris, France, such as Édouard Joseph Dantan, Jean-Baptiste-Camille Corot, Jean-Léon Gérôme, Eugène Delacroix, Vincent van Gogh and Édouard Manet. 
She is also known for running the Café du Tambourin in Paris.

Biography

Agostina Segatori was born in the Italian city of Ancona. 
In 1860 she posed for Manet and in 1873 for Jean-Baptiste-Camille Corot.
Little is known of her life until she met the Parisian painter Edward Dantan in 1873, with whom she lived in a stormy relationship until 1884. Agostina had a child by Dantan named Jean-Pierre Segatori. In 1874, she was depicted by Edward Dantan in the first work that he exhibited at the Salon, a wax medallion. During the summers of 1874, 1875 and 1877, Agostina Segatori posed many times for Dantan.

In 1884, Edward Dantan described his former mistress by the name of "Madame Segatori-Morière": it seems that Agostina Segatori had married a Mr. Morière. His son Jean-Pierre is also called Morière, so he may have been recognized or adopted by her husband.

Agostina Segatori is not only known for being the mistress of Edward Dantan, she was the proprietress of the Café Tambourin, at 62 Boulevard de Clichy in Paris. Segatori's Café du Tambourin was originally located at 27 rue de Richelieu in Paris, before reopening at 62 Boulevard de Clichy; Jules Chéret made a poster for the Cabaret at the reopening. The decor included works offered to her by Edward Dantan, but also featured those by Vincent van Gogh. In 1887, Henri de Toulouse-Lautrec created a portrait of Vincent van Gogh at the Café.

Agostina Segatori became famous for her relationship in the spring of 1887 with Vincent van Gogh, who lived in Paris from 1886 until 1888. There is little information on this relationship as Vincent van Gogh lived with his brother during this time, and there is thus very little correspondence between the brothers from this period. However Agostina Segatori was cited in two letters by the painter. Information on the relationship was related by one of the closest friends of Vincent van Gogh, the painter Émile Bernard in an article he wrote on Pere Tanguy, an important Parisian character in the 19th century. 
It seems that Vincent van Gogh and Agostina Segatori were very fond of each other, and she inspired the painter, who made two portraits of her and several nudes in oil.

Agostina Segatori gave Vincent van Gogh's first exhibition at her Café Tambourin. Their relationship quickly became stormy and they decided by mutual agreement to separate in July 1887. After this separation, Agostina Segatori improperly retained works by Van Gogh in her Café.

Agostina Segatori died in Paris in 1910 after experiencing a number of setbacks including the loss of her Café.

Representations of Segatori in French art of the nineteenth century
Agostina was a famous model. In 1860, she posed for Manet, who painted her portrait known as The Italian. 
This work, now held in a private collection in New York, was sold by the merchant Alphonse Portier to Alexander Cassatt, brother of Mary Cassatt. She then posed twice for the painter Jean-Baptiste-Camille Corot. 
The first work is called The Picture of Agostina and the second the Bacchante with tambourines. 
She was also painted by Jean-Léon Gérôme. 
Vincent van Gogh created two portraits of Agostina Segatori, one named The woman with the tambourine and the other the Italian.

References

1841 births
1910 deaths
Italian artists' models
19th-century Italian people
Muses
Vincent van Gogh
19th-century Italian women